Admiral Sir Michael Henry Gordon Layard,  (born 3 January 1936) is a retired senior Royal Navy officer who served as Second Sea Lord from 1992 to 1995.

Naval career
Educated at Pangbourne College and the Britannia Royal Naval College, Layard was commissioned into the Royal Navy in 1954. He trained as a fighter pilot and in 1970 he took command of 899 Naval Air Squadron flying Sea Vixens. During the Falklands War he was Senior Naval Officer in the MV Atlantic Conveyor, which was sunk by two exocet missiles.

Layard became Commander of RNAS Culdrose in 1982, Captain of the destroyer  in 1984 and Director Naval Warfare (Air) at the Ministry of Defence in 1985. He went on to be Flag Officer Naval Air Command in 1988, Director General, Naval Manpower and Training in 1990 and Second Sea Lord and Chief of Naval Personnel in 1992 (and, concurrently, President of the Royal Naval College, Greenwich from 1993). From 1994 he was asked to combine this role with that of Commander-in-Chief Naval Home Command.

Later life
In retirement Layard became a Trustee of the Fleet Air Arm Museum, and a Governor of Pangbourne College.

Layard owns a 32-foot yacht, Banjo.

Family
In 1966 Layard married Elspeth Horsley Fisher. They have two sons.

References

|-

|-

1936 births
Admiral presidents of the Royal Naval College, Greenwich
Living people
People educated at Pangbourne College
Knights Commander of the Order of the Bath
Commanders of the Order of the British Empire
Royal Navy admirals